Xinji is a county-level city of Hebei Province, North China, it is under the administration of the prefecture-level city of Shijiazhuang. It is the easternmost county-level division of Shijiangzhuang. There are 8 towns and 7 townships under the administration of Xinji.

Geography
Population: The population is 610,000 in the year 2003.
Area: 951 km2
Latitude: about 38° N
Longitude: about 115° E
Area code: +86+311
Post Code: 052360

Administrative divisions
Xinji City is sub-divided into 8 towns and 7 townships within its jurisdiction.

Towns:
Xinji, Zhangguzhuang, Weibo, Jiucheng, Xinleitou, Xincheng, Nanzhiqiong, Wangkou

Townships:
Xiaoxinzhuang Township, Zhonglixiang Township, Tiangongying Township, Qianying Township, Hemujing Township, Tianjiazhuang Township, Mazhuang Township

Climate

History
Xinji was formerly named Shulu County (束鹿县, Shùlù Xian), and became a county-level city in 1986.

References

External links
Official website of Xinji government
Blog: http://blog.ixinji.com
Information: http://www.ixinji.com

County-level cities in Hebei
Shijiazhuang